Bellefontaine Air Force Station (ADC ID: P-73, NORAD ID: Z-73) is a closed United States Air Force General Surveillance Radar station. It was closed in 1969.

History

Bellefontaine Air Force Station was one of twenty-eight stations built as part of the second segment of the Air Defense Command permanent radar network. Prompted by the start of the Korean War, on July 11, 1950, the Secretary of the Air Force asked the Secretary of Defense for approval to expedite construction of the permanent network. Receiving the Defense Secretary's approval on July 21, the Air Force directed the Corps of Engineers to proceed with construction.

The 664th Aircraft Control and Warning Squadron was assigned to a temporary site at Lockbourne AFB (L-22) on 1 January 1951 with an AN/TPS-1B radar.  In April 1952, the site at Bellefontaine became available and the squadron was moved.   At Bellefontaine, the 664th turned on AN/FPS-3 and AN/FPS-4 radar sets, and initially the station functioned as a Ground-Control Intercept (GCI) and warning station.  As a GCI station, the squadron's role was to guide interceptor aircraft toward unidentified intruders picked up on the unit's radar scopes.  In 1958 the 664th was operating AN/FPS-20 search and AN/FPS-6 and 6A height-finder radars.

During 1959 Bellefontaine AFS joined the Semi Automatic Ground Environment (SAGE) system, initially feeding data to DC-06 at Custer Air Force Station, Michigan. After joining, the squadron was re-designated as the 655th Radar Squadron (SAGE) on 1 September 1959. The radar squadron provided information 24/7 the SAGE Direction Center where it was analyzed to determine range, direction altitude speed and whether or not aircraft were friendly or hostile. The search radar was upgraded and redesignated as an AN/FPS-66 in 1961. On 31 July 1963, the site was redesignated as NORAD ID Z-73.

In addition to the main facility, Bellefontaine AFS operated the following AN/FPS-18 Gap Filler site:
 Richland Center, Indiana  (P-73J) 
Located atop "Mount Nebo", the site was transferred to Bellefontaine AFS when Custer AFS, Michigan (Z-67) closed in June 1965.  The gap filler was closed in June 1968.

By 1966 the site was using an AN/FPS-27. The 664th was inactivated in September 1969 due to budget reductions in ADC and the perceived low threat of an air attack on Lockbourne AFB. Today, the site had been redeveloped as the Ohio Hi-Point Career Center. Many of the former USAF buildings are still in use.

Air Force units and assignments

Units:
 664th Aircraft Control and Warning Squadron, activated on 1 January 1951 at Lockbourne AFB
 Moved to Bellefontaine AFS on 1 October 1951
 Re-designated 664th Radar Squadron (SAGE), 1 September 1959
 Inactivated on 30 September 1969

Assignments:
 541st Aircraft Control and Warning Group, 1 January 1951
 30th Air Division, 6 February 1952
 4706th Defense Wing, 16 February 1953
 58th Air Division, 1 March 1956
 30th Air Division, 1 September 1958
 Detroit Air Defense Sector, 1 April 1959
 34th Air Division, 1 April 1966 – 30 September 1969

See also
 United States general surveillance radar stations

References

  A Handbook of Aerospace Defense Organization 1946–1980,  by Lloyd H. Cornett and Mildred W. Johnson, Office of History, Aerospace Defense Center, Peterson Air Force Base, Colorado
 Winkler, David F. (1997), Searching the skies: the legacy of the United States Cold War defense radar program. Prepared for United States Air Force Headquarters Air Combat Command.
 Information for Bellefontaine AFS, OH

Installations of the United States Air Force in Ohio
Radar stations of the United States Air Force
Aerospace Defense Command military installations
1951 establishments in Ohio
1969 disestablishments in Ohio
Bellefontaine, Ohio
Military installations established in 1951
Military installations closed in 1969